Guy Klucevsek (born February 26, 1947) is an American-born accordionist and composer. Klucevsek is one of relatively few accordion players active in new music, jazz and free improvisation.

Klucevsek was born in New York City, and raised outside of Pittsburgh, Pennsylvania. He has released 20+ albums as a leader or co-leader, and has recorded or performed with Dave Douglas, John Zorn, Bill Frisell, Laurie Anderson and others. He is also a founding member of the international group Accordion Tribe.

In 2010 Klucevsek won a United States Artists Fellow award.

Discography

As leader
 Scenes from a Mirage (Review, 1987)
 Who Stole the Polka? (Eva, 1991)
 Flying Vegetables of the Apocalypse (Experimental Intermedia, 1991)
 Polka Dots & Laser Beams (Eva, 1992)
 Manhattan Cascade (CRI, 1992)
 Transylvanian Softwear (John Marks, 1994)
 Citrus, My Love (RecRec Music, 1995)
 Stolen Memories (Tzadik, 1996)
 Altered Landscapes (EVVA, 1998)
 Accordance with Alan Bern (Winter & Winter, 2000)
 Free Range Accordion (Starkland, 2000)
 The Heart of the Andes (Winter & Winter, 2002)
 Tales from the Cryptic with Phillip Johnston (Winter & Winter, 2003)
 Notefalls with Alan Bern (Winter & Winter, 2007)
 Song of Remembrance (Tzadik, 2007)
 Dancing On the Volcano (Tzadik, 2009)
 The Multiple Personality Reunion Tour (Innova, 2012)
 Teetering On the Verge of Normalcy (Starkland, 2016)

With Accordion Tribe
 Accordion Tribe (Intuition, 1998)
 Sea of Reeds (Intuition, 2002)
 Lunghorn Twist (Intuition, 2006)

As sideman
With Dave Douglas
 Charms of the Night Sky (Winter & Winter, 1998)
 A Thousand Evenings (BMG/RCA Victor, 2000)
 El Trilogy (BMG/RCA Victor, 2001)

With others
 Rahim AlHaj, Little Earth (UR Music, 2010)
 Laurie Anderson, Bright Red (Warner Bros., 1994)
 Laurie Anderson, Life On a String (Nonesuch, 2001)
 Boston Pops Orchestra & Keith Lockhart, Lights, Camera, Music! (BSO Classics, 2017)
 Anthony Braxton, 4 (Ensemble) Compositions 1992 (Black Saint, 1993)
 Mary Ellen Childs, Kilter (Experimental Intermedia, 1999)
 Anthony Coleman, Disco by Night (Avant, 1992)
 Nicolas Collins, It Was a Dark and Stormy Night (Trace Elements, 1992)
 Lukas Foss, Music by Lukas Foss (CRI, 1980)
 Bill Frisell, Have a Little Faith (Elektra Nonesuch, 1993)
 Fred Frith, Stone, Brick, Glass, Wood, Wire (I Dischi di Angelica, 1999)
 David Garland, Control Songs (Review, 1986)
 David Garland, Togetherness: Control Songs Vol. 2 (Ergodic, 1999)
 Robin Holcomb, Rockabye (Elektra Musician 1992)
 Phillip Johnston, Music for Films (Tzadik, 1998)
 Jerome Kitzke, The Character of American Sunlight (Innova, 2013)
 Mary Jane Leach, 4BC/Green Mountain Madrigal/Lake Eden/Trio for Duo (1987)
 Natalie Merchant, Motherland (Elektra, 2001)
 Michael Moore, Holocene (Ramboy, 2008)
 Phill Niblock, The Movement of PeopleWorking (Extreme/Microcinema, 2008)
 Pauline Oliveros, Tara's Room + Sounding Way (Important, 2019)
 Bobby Previte, Claude's Late Morning (Gramavision, 1988)
 Relache, Here and Now (Callisto, 1983)
 John Zorn, The Big Gundown (Nonesuch, 1986)
 John Zorn, Cobra (Hat Hut, 1987)
 Peter Zummo, Zummo with an X (New World, 2006)
 Peter Zummo, Lateral Pass (Foom, 2014)
 Tom Waits, Orphans: Brawlers, Bawlers & Bastards (Anti-, 2006)
 Tom Waits, Orphans: Bastards (Anti-, 2018)

Sources
Franklin, Joseph, Settling scores: a life in the margins of American music, Sunstone Press, 2006. 
Jenkins, Todd S. "Klucevsek, Guy", Free jazz and free improvisation: An encyclopedia, Volume 2, Greenwood Publishing Group, 2004, p. 200. .  
Ross, Alex, Classical Music in Review: Guy Klucevsek Accordionist, Dance Theater Workshop,  New York Times, 2 October 1993
Wolk, Douglas, "A world of squeezeboxes", CMJ New Music Monthly, May 1997, p. 10

References

External links
Official Homepage

Art of the States: Guy Klucevsek
Transylvanian Softwear CD on Starkland
Free Range Accordion CD on Starkland
Discography

1947 births
American accordionists
Living people
American jazz accordionists
American male jazz musicians
Klezmer musicians
Contemporary classical music performers
Tzadik Records artists
Avant-garde jazz accordionists
Musicians from Pittsburgh
21st-century accordionists
Jazz musicians from Pennsylvania
21st-century American male musicians